The 1994 United States Senate election in North Dakota was held on November 8, 1994. Incumbent Democratic-NPL U.S. Senator Kent Conrad won re-election to his first full term as senior Senator, although technically his second term in the position, having served the end of Quentin Burdick's term after his death. Conrad also had served an additional term as junior Senator from 1987 to 1992.

Candidates

Dem-NPL 
 Kent Conrad, incumbent U.S. Senator

Republican 
 Ben Clayburgh, Air Force veteran

Results

See also 
 1994 United States Senate elections

References

External links 
 1994 North Dakota U.S. Senate Election results

North Dakota
1994
1994 North Dakota elections